WJEZ (98.9 FM, "Classic Hits 98.9") is a radio station licensed to the community of Dwight, Illinois, United States, and serving the greater Livingston County, Illinois, area. The station is owned by Cumulus Media and licensed to Cumulus Licensing LLC, which purchased the station from Townsquare Media. It airs a classic hits music format. In addition, the station superserves the area with news and information in addition to religious programming on Sundays.

The station was assigned the WJEZ call letters by the Federal Communications Commission on May 16, 2003.

On November 29, 2012, WJEZ changed their format from adult contemporary to classic hits.

References

External links
WJEZ official website
Radio Bloomington

JEZ
Classic hits radio stations in the United States
Radio stations established in 1998
Livingston County, Illinois
Cumulus Media radio stations